Doctor Watson and the Darkwater Hall Mystery is a 1974 British made-for-television mystery film directed by James Cellan Jones and starring Edward Fox as Doctor Watson.

Plot
While Sherlock Holmes is away on holiday, Watson journeys to Darkwater Hall in the Cotswolds to protect a woman's husband from harm.

Cast
 Edward Fox as Dr. Watson
 Elaine Taylor as Emily
 Christopher Cazenove as Sir Harry
 Jeremy Clyde as Miles
 John Westbrook as Bradshaw
 Terence Bayler as Carlos
 Carmen Gómez as Dolores
 Anthony Langdon as Paul "Black Paul"

Production
Filmed at Stow-on-the-Wold, Watson was portrayed as competent and intelligent as opposed to the popular idea of a bumbling character as Nigel Bruce portrayed him in an earlier series of fourteen films. He is also portrayed as a virile womanizer as the character claims to be in The Sign of the Four.

The film references A Study in Scarlet, "The Adventure of Black Peter", "The Adventure of the Musgrave Ritual" and "The Adventure of the Speckled Band". Fox would go on to play the character of Alistair Ross in another Sherlock Holmes pastiche, The Crucifer of Blood.

Reception
According to author Kingsley Amis, "the reviews were excellent." Alan Barnes calls the film "part-deconstruction, part-parody of Doyle" that "ends up resembling a long drawn-out shaggy dog story."

References

External links 

1974 television films
1974 films
1970s mystery films
British television films
British mystery films
Films set in 1913
Sherlock Holmes pastiches
Sherlock Holmes films
Films directed by James Cellan Jones
1970s British films